The S5 is a commuter railway route forming part of the Milan suburban railway service, which converges on the city of Milan, Italy.

The route runs over the infrastructure of the Porto Ceresio–Milan, Milan Passante and Milan–Venice railways.

Unlike all of the other Milan suburban railway service routes, which are operated by Trenord, line S5 is operated by a joint venture comprising Trenitalia, Ferrovie Nord Milano Trasporti (FNM), and Azienda Trasporti Milanesi (ATM), the public company responsible for public transport in the municipality of Milan and some of its surrounding municipalities.

Route 

  Varese ↔ Milano Passante ↔ Treviglio

Line S5, a cross-city route, heads initially in a southerly direction from Varese to Gallarate, and then southeasterly to Rho.  From there, the line runs through the municipality of Milan, via the Milan Passante railway, to Milano Porta Vittoria, and finally in an easterly direction to Treviglio. The complete journey takes 2 hours and 7 minutes.

History
The S5 was activated on 12 December 2004, and operated initially between Varese and Pioltello-Limito.  At that time, its operator was Trenitalia, under a two-year service contract with the region of Lombardy.

On 1 July 2008, responsibility for operating the line passed to a joint venture comprising Trenitalia, FNM and ATM. The joint venturers had won a tender that had been launched by the region in 2004, and had pledged to provide free transport of bicycles on public holidays. On the same date, 15 new TSR trains began to enter service.  The regional administration had committed itself to offering these trains to the successful tenderer.

On the occasion of the timetable change on 13 December 2009, the line was extended from Pioltello-Limito to Treviglio.
 
In May 2011, as a result of the merger between the regional passenger division of Trenitalia and the FNM subsidiary LeNORD, the merged entity, Trenord, took over the two railway companies' roles in the joint venture.

Stations 
The stations on the S5 are as follows (stations with blue background are in the municipality of Milan):

Rolling stock 
S5 trains are made up of a 3-car Treno Servizio Regionale (TSR) combined with a 5-car TSR, except on Saturdays and Sundays, when 3-car TSRs are used on some trains, and 5-car TSRs operate the remaining, more heavily patronised services.

Scheduling 
, S5 trains ran every half-hour between 06:00 and 00:30 daily.  Between 09:00 and 11:00, and between 21:00 and 00:30, some S5 services operated only between Gallarate and Treviglio.

See also 

 History of rail transport in Italy
 List of Milan suburban railway stations
 Rail transport in Italy
 Transport in Milan

References

External links
 ATM – official site 
 FNM Group – official site 
 Trenitalia – official site 
 Schematic of Line S5 – schematic depicting all stations on Line S5

This article is based upon a translation of the Italian language version as at November 2012.

Milan S Lines